Micrelenchus tenebrosus is a species of sea snail, a marine gastropod mollusk in the family Trochidae, the top snails.

Description
The shell grows to a length of 6 mm . The solid, conical shell is elevated, imperforate, and rather thick. Its color is dark bluish-black, or with a purple shade. The spire is conoidal. The sutures are slightly impressed. The apex is somewhat obtuse, a trifle eroded and whitish at the tip. The six whorls are very slightly convex, those of the spire encircled by about seven lirae of about the same width as their interstices. The body whorl is very bluntly subangular at the periphery, with about 20 spiral lirae, and fine delicate growth lines. The aperture is rounded-quadrate, oblique, less than ½ the total length of the shell. The outer lip is very narrowly black-edged. It isbordered by a series of short fine sulcations, beyond which there is a porcellaneous thickening. The throat is nacreous, iridescent, the reflections mainly green. The columella is subvertical, a trifle arcuate, rounded and pillar-like, covering the umbilicus above. The parietal wall has a thin whitish callus. The upper angle of the aperture is angular and slightly channeled.

Distribution
This marine species is endemic to New Zealand and occurs off North Island, South and Stewart Island

References

 Powell, A.W.B. 1946. New species of New Zealand Mollusca from the South Island, Stewart Island and Chatham Islands. Records of the Auckland Institute and Museum 3: 137-144
 Powell, A.W.B. 1979: New Zealand Mollusca: Marine, Land and Freshwater Shells. Collins, Auckland 500p (p. 57)
 Marshall, B.A. 1998: The New Zealand Recent species of Cantharidus Montfort, 1810 and Micrelenchus Finlay, 1926 (Mollusca: Gastropoda: Trochidae). Molluscan Research 19: 107-156 (p. 125)
 Spencer, H.G., Marshall, B.A. & Willan, R.C. (2009). Checklist of New Zealand living Mollusca. pp 196–219. in: Gordon, D.P. (ed.) New Zealand inventory of biodiversity. Volume one. Kingdom Animalia: Radiata, Lophotrochozoa, Deuterostomia. Canterbury University Press, Christchurch.

External links
 To World Register of Marine Species
 
 Adams A. (1853 ("1851")). Contributions towards a monograph of the Trochidæ, a family of gasteropodous Mollusca. Proceedings of the Zoological Society of London. 19: 150-192
 Tenison Woods, J. E. (1877). On some new Tasmanian marine shells. (Second series). Papers and Proceedings and Report of the Royal Society of Tasmania. (1876): 131-159
 Fischer P. (1873-1879). [continuation of Kiener] Spécies général et iconographie des coquilles vivantes. Volume 10, Famille des Turbinacées. Genre Turbo (Turbo), pp. i-iv + 1-128 (1873), pls 1, 28, 44-49, 53-54, 57-120. Volume 11, Genres Troque (Trochus, including Calcar), pp. 1–96, pls 37-86 (1875); 97-144 (1876); 145-240 (1877); 241-336 (1878); 337-423, Xenophora pp. 424–450, Tectarius pp. 451–459, Risella pp. 460–463, Index 464-480 (1879). 

tenebrosus
Gastropods described in 1853